Service discovery is the process of automatically detecting devices and services on a computer network. This reduces the need for manual configuration by users and administrators. A service discovery protocol (SDP) is a network protocol that helps accomplish service discovery. Service discovery aims to reduce the configuration efforts required by users and administrators. 

Service discovery requires a common language to allow software agents to make use of one another's services without the need for continuous user intervention.

Protocols
There are many service discovery protocols, including:
 Bluetooth Service Discovery Protocol (SDP)
 DNS Service Discovery (DNS-SD), a component of zero-configuration networking
 DNS, as used for example in Kubernetes
 Dynamic Host Configuration Protocol (DHCP)
 Internet Storage Name Service (iSNS)
 Jini for Java objects.
 Lightweight Service Discovery (LSD), for mobile ad hoc networks 
 Link Layer Discovery Protocol (LLDP) standards-based neighbor discovery protocol similar to vendor-specific protocols which find each other by advertising to vendor-specific broadcast addresses (versus all-1's), such Cabletron (Enterasys) and Cisco Discovery Protocol (both referred to as CDP but different formats). 
 Local Peer Discovery, or Local Service Discovery
 Multicast Source Discovery Protocol (MSDP), usually used for unicast exchange of multicast source information between anycast Rendez-Vous Points (RPs) to service mcast clients. 
 Service Location Protocol (SLP)
 Session Announcement Protocol (SAP) used to discover RTP sessions
 Simple Service Discovery Protocol (SSDP), a component of Universal Plug and Play (UPnP)
 Universal Description Discovery and Integration (UDDI) for web services
 Web Proxy Autodiscovery Protocol (WPAD)
 WS-Discovery (Web Services Dynamic Discovery)
 XMPP Service Discovery (XEP-0030)
 XRDS (eXtensible Resource Descriptor Sequence) used by XRI, OpenID, OAuth, etc.

See also 
 Discoverability
 Semantic web

References

External links
 Service Discovery S-Cube Knowledge Model
 Dong, H., Hussain, F.K., Chang, E.: Semantic Web Service matchmakers: State of the art and challenges[Online]. Concurrency and Computation: Practice and Experience 25(7) (May 2013) pp. 961–988. Accessed on June 16, 2015.
 Sun, L., Dong, H., Hussain, F.K., Hussain, O.K., Chang, E.: Cloud service selection: State-of-the-art and future research directions. Journal of Network and Computer Applications[Online] 45 (October 2014) pp. 134–150. Date accessed: 16 June 2015.

Internet protocols
Application layer protocols
Computer configuration
Service-oriented (business computing)